Jordan Tell (born 10 June 1997) is a French professional footballer who plays as forward for Ligue 2 club Grenoble.

Club career
In July 2020, Tell joined Clermont.

On 31 January 2022, Tell signed a 1.5-year contract with Grenoble.

References

External links

Living people
1997 births
Association football forwards
French footballers
France youth international footballers
Guadeloupean footballers
French people of Guadeloupean descent
Ligue 1 players
Ligue 2 players
Stade Malherbe Caen players
Stade Rennais F.C. players
Valenciennes FC players
US Orléans players
Clermont Foot players
Grenoble Foot 38 players